China is home to 346 species of amphibian.  China's amphibian diversity is greater than any other country in the Old World, and it is the 5th in the whole world. China's amphibian fauna includes an important element of widespread, generally non-threatened species though 27.3% of amphibian species are extinct or threatened and because conservation assessments of Chinese amphibians have only started recently, it is likely that the current data on threats to amphibians are insufficient. Several amphibian species in China have very limited geographical distributions.

Frogs

True Frogs (Ranidae) 

 Amolops aniqiaoensis
 Amolops bellulus
 Amolops chunganensis
 Amolops gerbillus
 Amolops granulosus
 Amolops hainanensis
 Amolops jinjiangensis
 Amolops kangtingensis
 Amolops liangshanensis
 Amolops lifanensis
 Amolops loloensis
 Amolops mantzorum
 Amolops medogensis
 Amolops monticola
 Amolops ricketti
 Amolops torrentis
 Amolops viridimaculatus
 Amolops wuyiensis
 Babina adenopleura
 Babina hainanensis
 Babina lini
 Babina pleuraden
 Chevron-spotted brown frog
 Eastern golden frog
 Emei music frog
 Glandirana minima
 Glandirana tientaiensis
 Huanren frog
 Imienpo Station frog
 Johns' groove-toed frog
 Korean brown frog
 Odorrana andersonii
 Odorrana anlungensis
 Odorrana chapaensis
 Odorrana chloronota
 Odorrana exiliversabilis
 Odorrana grahami
 Odorrana graminea
 Odorrana hejiangensis
 Odorrana kuangwuensis
 Odorrana lungshengensis
 Odorrana margaretae
 Odorrana mutschmanni
 Odorrana schmackeri
 Odorrana tiannanensis
 Odorrana versabilis
 Odorrana wuchuanensis
 Pelophylax fukienensis
 Pelophylax hubeiensis
 Pelophylax lateralis
 Pelophylax nigromaculatus
 Pelophylax tenggerensis
 Pelophylax terentievi
 Plateau brown frog
 Rana amurensis
 Rana chensinensis
 Rana omeimontis
 Rana sangzhiensis
 Rana weiningensis
 Rana zhengi

Dicroglossidae 

 Chinese edible frog
 Concave-eared torrent frog
 Doichang frog
 Fejervarya limnocharis
 Fejervarya moodiei
 Fejervarya multistriata
 Limnonectes longchuanensis
 Nanorana arnoldi
 Nanorana blanfordii
 Nanorana bourreti
 Nanorana conaensis
 Nanorana feae
 Nanorana liebigii
 Nanorana maculosa
 Nanorana medogensis
 Nanorana pleskei
 Nanorana polunini
 Nanorana quadranus
 Nanorana taihangnica
 Nanorana unculuanus
 Nanorana ventripunctata
 Nanorana yunnanensis
 Northern frog
 Kuhl's creek frog
 Quasipaa verrucospinosa
 Quasipaa boulengeri
 Quasipaa exilispinosa
 Quasipaa jiulongensis
 Quasipaa shini
 Quasipaa spinosa
 Quasipaa yei
 Round-tongued floating frog

Ceratobatrachidae 

 Liurana

Tree Frogs 

 Annam tree frog
 Common Chinese tree frog
 Hyla sanchiangensis
 Hyla zhaopingensis: only in Zhaoping County, Guangxi
 Hylarana cubitalis
 Hylarana hekouensis
 Hylarana latouchii
 Hylarana macrodactyla
 Hylarana maosonensis
 Hylarana menglaensis
 Hylarana milleti
 Hylarana nigrovittata
 Hylarana spinulosa
 Hylarana taipehensis
 Japanese tree frog
 Chinese flying frog
 Chiromantis vittatus
 Feihyla palpebralis
 Gracixalus gracilipes
 Gracixalus jinxiuensis
 Gracixalus medogensis
 Gracixalus nonggangensis
 Kurixalus naso
 Kurixalus odontotarsus
 Kurixalus verrucosus
 Raorchestes longchuanensis
 Raorchestes menglaensis
 Rhacophorus burmanus
 Rhacophorus chenfui
 Rhacophorus dorsoviridis
 Rhacophorus dugritei
 Rhacophorus feae
 Rhacophorus hui
 Rhacophorus hungfuensis
 Rhacophorus kio
 Rhacophorus maximus
 Rhacophorus nigropunctatus
 Rhacophorus omeimontis
 Rhacophorus puerensis
 Rhacophorus rhodopus
 Rhacophorus tuberculatus
 Rhacophorus yaoshanensis
 Romer's tree frog
 Sylvirana guentheri

Microhylidae 

 Calluella yunnanensis
 Boreal digging frog
 Kalophrynus interlineatus
 Kalophrynus menglienicus
 Kaloula nonggangensis
 Kaloula rugifera
 Kaloula verrucosa
 Microhyla berdmorei
 Microhyla fissipes
 Microhyla heymonsi
 Microhyla pulchra
 Micryletta inornata
 Microhyla butleri

Litter Frogs 

 Brachytarsophrys carinense
 Brachytarsophrys feae
 Brachytarsophrys popei
 Buergeria oxycephala
 Leptolalax alpinus
 Leptolalax liui
 Leptolalax oshanensis
 Leptolalax sungi
 Leptolalax tengchongensis
 Leptolalax ventripunctatus
 Megophrys binchuanensis
 Megophrys brachykolos
 Megophrys cheni
 Megophrys huangshanensis
 Megophrys lini
 Megophrys major
 Megophrys parva
 Megophrys sangzhiensis
 Megophrys shuichengensis
 Megophrys wawuensis
 Oreolalax chuanbeiensis
 Oreolalax granulosus
 Oreolalax jingdongensis
 Oreolalax liangbeiensis
 Oreolalax lichuanensis
 Oreolalax major
 Oreolalax multipunctatus
 Oreolalax nanjiangensis: only in Nanjiang County, Sichuan
 Oreolalax omeimontis
 Oreolalax pingii
 Oreolalax popei
 Oreolalax puxiongensis
 Oreolalax rhodostigmatus
 Oreolalax rugosus
 Oreolalax schmidti
 Oreolalax weigoldi
 Oreolalax xiangchengensis
 Scutiger boulengeri
 Scutiger brevipes
 Scutiger chintingensis
 Scutiger glandulatus
 Scutiger gongshanensis
 Scutiger jiulongensis
 Scutiger liupanensis
 Scutiger maculatus
 Scutiger mammatus
 Scutiger muliensis: only in Muli, Sichuan
 Scutiger ningshanensis
 Scutiger nyingchiensis
 Scutiger pingwuensis
 Scutiger sikimmensis
 Scutiger tuberculatus
 Scutiger wanglangensis

Shrub Frogs (Rhacophoridae) 

 Liuixalus hainanus
 Liuixalus ocellatus
 Theloderma kwangsiense: only in Dayaoshan Nature Reserve (大瑶山自然保护区), Guangxi
 Philautus kempii
 Polypedates impresus
 Polypedates megacephalus
 Polypedates mutus
 Theloderma asperum
 Theloderma kwangsiense
 Theloderma moloch
 Theloderma rhododiscus

Salt Water Frogs 
China is home to one of only 144 known modern amphibians which can tolerate brief excursions into sea water.

 Crab-eating frog

Toads

True Toads (Bufo) 

 Ailao toad
 Asiatic toad
 Bufo cryptotympanicus
 Bufo pageoti
 Bufo tuberculatus
 Bufo wolongensis: only in Wolong Nature Reserve, Sichuan
 Korean water toad
 Pseudepidalea pewzowi

Horned Toads (Xenophrys) 

 Convex-tailed horned toad
 Convex-vented horned toad
 Great piebald horned toad
 Jingdong horned toad
 Kuatun horned toad
 Mangshan horned toad
 Medog horned toad
 Mount Dawei horned toad
 Nankiang horned toad
 Boettger's horned toad
 Glandular horned toad
 Omei horned toad
 Xenophrys daweimontis: only in Daweishan Nature Reserve (大围山自然保护区), Liuyang, Hunan
 spiny-fingered horned toad
 Wuliangshan horned toad
 Wushan horned toad
 Zhang's horned toad

Other Toads 

 Mongolian toad
 Bombina maxima
 Duttaphrynus himalayanus
 Duttaphrynus melanostictus
 Leptobrachium ailaonicum
 Leptobrachium boringii
 Leptobrachium hainanense
 Leptobrachium leishanense
 Leptobrachium liui
 Little horned toad
 Ophryophryne microstoma
 Ophryophryne pachyproctus
 Oriental fire-bellied toad
 rough-skinned horned toad
 Shaping horned toad
 spiny-fingered horned toad

Salamanders and Newts 

 Amji's salamander
 Black knobby newt
 Central Asian salamander
 Chenggong fire belly newt
 Chiala mountain salamander
 Chinese giant salamander (Andrias davidianus)
 Chinese fire belly newt
 Chinese warty newt
 Chinhai spiny newt
 Chuxiong fire-bellied newt
 Siberian salamander
 Cynops wolterstorffi: only in Kunming City, Yunnan
 Dayang newt
 Fischer's clawed salamander
 Fuding fire belly newt
 Guabang Shan salamander
 Guangxi warty newt
 Guizhou salamander
 Hainan knobby newt
 Hong Kong warty newt
 Jinfo Mountain salamander
 Korean salamander
 Kuankuoshui salamander
 Pachyhynobius shangchengensis
 Paramesotriton labiatus
 Paramesotriton maolanensis
 Paramesotriton yunwuensis
 Puxiong salamander
 Shuicheng salamander
 Siberian salamander
 Spot-tailed warty newt
 Spotted paddle-tail newt
 Taliang knobby newt
 Wanggao warty newt
 Wenxian knobby newt
 Western Chinese mountain salamander
 Xingan salamander
 Yellow-spotted salamander
 Yiwu salamander
 Yunnan lake newt
 Zhijin warty newt

Caecilians 

 Banna caecilian (Ichthyophis bannanicus)

References 

China
China
amphibians